Michael Kenneth Moore (born December 12, 1984) is a Canadian professional ice hockey defenceman for the Fischtown Pinguins of the Deutsche Eishockey Liga (DEL).

Playing career
Undrafted, Moore was signed by the San Jose Sharks to an entry-level contract. Moore scored his first NHL goal on November 17, 2010 against goaltender Peter Budaj of the Colorado Avalanche in just his second NHL game.

After spending his first four professional seasons within the Sharks organization, Moore left as a free agent to sign a one-year contract with the Nashville Predators on July 3, 2012.

On July 5, 2013, Moore was again a free agent and signed a one-year, two-way contract with the Boston Bruins. He was assigned to lead AHL affiliate, the Providence Bruins, for the duration of the 2013–14 season, posting 21 points in 75 games.

On July 1, 2014, Moore left the Bruins organization and signed as a free agent to a one-year, two-way contract with the Washington Capitals.

Moore spent the next two seasons within the Capitals organization with AHL affiliate, the Hershey Bears. After a run with the Bears to the Calder Cup Finals in the 2015–16 season, Moore left as a free agent to pursue a European career. On July 17, 2016, he agreed to a one-year deal with new DEL entrant, the Fischtown Pinguins.

Career statistics

Awards and honors

References

External links
 

1984 births
Living people
Canadian ice hockey defencemen
Fischtown Pinguins players
Hershey Bears players
Milwaukee Admirals players
Princeton Tigers men's ice hockey players
Providence Bruins players
San Jose Sharks players
Ice hockey people from Calgary
Undrafted National Hockey League players
Worcester Sharks players
Canadian expatriate ice hockey players in Germany
AHCA Division I men's ice hockey All-Americans